Jackson Davies (born 17 March 1950) is a Canadian actor. He is best known for his role as RCMP Constable John Constable in the television series The Beachcombers, which he reprised in the TV movies The New Beachcombers (2002) and A Beachcombers Christmas (2004).

Career 
Originally from Wetaskiwin, Alberta and now living in Vancouver, British Columbia, he has acted in over 160 stage shows in most of the major theatres in Canada. He has appeared in over 300 TV shows and been in 30 TV movies and feature films.

Jackson is the vice president of the Union of BC Performers / ACTRA, the past vice chair of the BC Arts Council and a faculty member in both the Performing Arts and Motion Picture Arts programs at Capilano University. He is an Honorary Sergeant of the RCMP, a rarely bestowed designation.

Davies, and Marc Strange, one of the original producers of The Beachcombers, published Bruno and the Beach: The Beachcombers at 40 in 2013. The book is a history of the show and a profile of key members of the cast and crew.

Filmography

Film

Television

References

External links 
 
 Jackson Davies faculty profile – Capilano University

1950 births
Male actors from Vancouver
Canadian male film actors
Canadian male stage actors
Canadian male television actors
Living people
People from Wetaskiwin
Male actors from Alberta
Academic staff of Capilano University
20th-century Canadian male actors
21st-century Canadian male actors